Kristianstad Municipality (Kristianstads kommun) is a municipality in Skåne County in southernmost Sweden. Its seat is located in the city Kristianstad.

The present municipality was created in three steps during the last nationwide local government reform, and it has the largest area of the municipalities of Skåne County. In 1967 a number of rural municipalities were merged into the City of Kristianstad. In 1971 more former units were added and the city became a unitary municipality. Finally in 1974, the last amalgamations took place, and the municipality reached its present size. The number of original entities (as of 1863) is 35.

Geography 
Its size of  makes it the largest municipality in Skåne County by area.

Localities
There are 26 urban areas in Kristianstad Municipality.

In the table, the urban areas are listed according to the size of the population as of December 31, 2020. The municipal seat is in bold characters.

International relations

Twin towns — Sister cities
The municipality is twinned with:

  Espoo, Finland
  Kongsberg, Norway
  Koszalin, Poland
  Køge Municipality, Denmark
  Rendsburg, Germany
  Šiauliai, Lithuania
  Skagafjörður, Iceland

See also
University College of Kristianstad
Kristianstad County (abolished 1998)
Söderportgymnasiet

References
Statistics Sweden

External links

Kristianstad - Official site
Coat of arms

 
Municipalities of Skåne County